Joseph A. Kitchen was a North Dakota state legislator and the state Commissioner of Agriculture and Labor from 1921 to 1932.

References

External links
List of North Dakota Commissioners of Agriculture and Labor - Wikipedia, the free encyclopedia
Political party strength in North Dakota - Wikipedia
Department History | North Dakota Department of Agriculture
Digital Horizons - Search Results (a few photos of Commissioner Kitchen)
North Dakota Department of Agriculture - Biennial Report 2009 - 2011
Directory of Agricultural and Home Economics Leaders, United States and Canada: Vocational Teachers - William Grant Wilson, 1922 (Google Search for Joseph A. Kitchen North Dakota

Year of birth missing
Year of death missing
North Dakota Commissioners of Agriculture and Labor
Members of the North Dakota House of Representatives